The Texas Tech Red Raiders football program is a college football team that represents Texas Tech University in the Big 12 Conference in the National Collegiate Athletic Association (NCAA) Division I Football Bowl Subdivision. The program has had 17 head coaches, and three interim head coaches, since it began play during the 1925 season.

Texas Tech (then known as Texas Technological College) was known as the "Matadors" from 1925 to 1936, a name suggested by the wife of Ewing Y. Freeland, the first football coach, to reflect the influence of the Spanish Renaissance architecture on campus. In 1932, Texas Tech joined the Border Intercollegiate Athletic Association. The school's short-lived Matadors moniker was replaced officially in 1937 with "Red Raiders", the nickname the team has had ever since.  The same year, Pete Cawthon, Texas Tech's third head coach, led the team to their first conference championship and bowl game berth, a 7–6 loss to the West Virginia Mountaineers in the Sun Bowl. Texas Tech suffered four more bowl losses, under two head coaches, before their first postseason win in the 1952 Sun Bowl, under first-year head coach DeWitt Weaver. Before withdrawing from the Border Conference in 1956, the Red Raiders won nine conference championships, the most held by a Border Conference member. Weaver and his predecessor Dell Morgan each won four conference championships, a record for a Texas Tech head coach.

In 1960, Texas Tech was admitted to the Southwest Conference. The Red Raiders won two conference championships in 1976 and 1994, under head coaches Steve Sloan and Spike Dykes respectively. Texas Tech became a charter member in the South Division of the Big 12 Conference in 1996 when the Southwest Conference disbanded. During his ninth season as head coach, Mike Leach led Texas Tech to the program's first division championship in 2008. After Leach was fired at the end of the 2009 season, Ruffin McNeill was named interim head coach for the Alamo Bowl. Tommy Tuberville coached the Red Raiders from 2010 to 2012, resigning after the conclusion of the regular season. Kliff Kingsbury, a former standout quarterback at Texas Tech, coached the Red Raider from 2013 to 2018. Matt Wells, coached the Red Raiders from 2019 to 2021, being fired before the conclusion of the season. Sonny Cumbie will serve as interim head coach for the remainder of 2021.  Texas Tech hired Joey McGuire on November 8, 2021 for the 2022 season. McGuire was previously the associate head coach and outside linebackers coach at Baylor University.

Key

Coaches

Notes

References
General

 

Specific

Texas Tech Red Raiders

Red Raiders
Texas Tech Red Raiders head football coaches